João Mário Nunes Fernandes (born 11 October 1993) is a Bissau-Guinean professional footballer who plays as a forward for Bulgarian club FC Spartak Varna.

Club career
Born in Bissau, João Mário moved to Portugal to complete his development in late 2011, joining S.L. Benfica. On 11 August 2012 he made his debut as a professional, appearing as a late substitute for the reserve team in a 2–2 home draw against S.C. Braga B in the Segunda Liga. Sixteen days later, in the same competition, he scored his first goal, contributing to a 6–0 home rout of C.F. Os Belenenses after a free kick by Miguel Rosa hit the bar and bounced back to him.

In the following years, João Mário continued competing in the Portuguese second division, representing Atlético Clube de Portugal and G.D. Chaves. He netted once from 22 matches in the 2015–16 season, as the latter club returned to the Primeira Liga after an absence of 17 years.

João Mário's first match in the Portuguese top flight took place on 20 August 2016, and he scored in the 1–1 draw with C.D. Tondela at the Estádio Municipal Eng. Manuel Branco Teixeira. He only appeared in a further eight games during the campaign, in an escape from relegation.

Subsequently, João Mário returned to division two, agreeing to a contract at Académico de Viseu F.C. as a free agent. He scored two goals in the side's semi-final run in the 2019–20 Taça de Portugal, including in a 1–1 home draw against FC Porto in the first leg of that stage.

João Mário signed with second-tier Académica de Coimbra on 22 July 2020. The following March, while on international duty, he suffered a serious injury that sidelined him for nearly one year.

On 29 July 2022, João Mário joined U.D. Vilafranquense as a free agent. He moved to the First Professional Football League (Bulgaria) in the following transfer window, on a one-and-a-half-year contract at FC Spartak Varna.

International career
João Mário earned his first cap for Guinea-Bissau before his 18th birthday, in a friendly in Equatorial Guinea. He scored his first goal for his country on 13 November 2019, in a 3–0 defeat of Eswatini in his hometown for the 2021 Africa Cup of Nations qualifiers.

International goals
 (Guinea-Bissau score listed first, score column indicates score after each João Mário goal)

References

External links

1993 births
Living people
Sportspeople from Bissau
Bissau-Guinean footballers
Association football forwards
Étoile Lusitana players
Primeira Liga players
Liga Portugal 2 players
S.L. Benfica B players
Atlético Clube de Portugal players
G.D. Chaves players
Académico de Viseu F.C. players
Associação Académica de Coimbra – O.A.F. players
U.D. Vilafranquense players
First Professional Football League (Bulgaria) players
PFC Spartak Varna players
Guinea-Bissau international footballers
2017 Africa Cup of Nations players
Bissau-Guinean expatriate footballers
Expatriate footballers in Portugal
Expatriate footballers in Bulgaria
Bissau-Guinean expatriate sportspeople in Portugal
Bissau-Guinean expatriate sportspeople in Bulgaria